Krymsky (Qırım) is a rural locality (a selo) in Abdrashitovsky Selsoviet, Alsheyevsky District, Bashkortostan, Russia. The population was 529 as of 2010. There are 8  streets.

Geography 
Krymsky is located 24 km east of Rayevsky (the district's administrative centre) by road. Maloabdrashitovo is the nearest rural locality.

References 

Rural localities in Alsheyevsky District